Gondon Abbey (also Gondom;) is a former Cistercian monastery in Monbahus, Lot-et-Garonne, Aquitaine, France, about 21 kilometres to the north-west of Villeneuve-sur-Lot.

History  
The abbey was probably founded in 1123 with an endowment from the lords of Lauzun, as a daughter house of Cadouin Abbey, of the filiation of Pontigny. In 1147 the community became the mother house of Fontguilhem Abbey, founded in 1124, when it affiliated itself to the Cistercian Order.

The prosperous and influential abbey, noted for its wine production, was weakened by the Hundred Years' War in the 14th century, and the imposition of commendatory abbots and the French Wars of Religion in the 16th century.

It was suppressed in 1791 during the French Revolution.

Buildings 
The site, now used for agricultural purposes, contains some remnants of the conventual buildings, including a dovecote.

Sources 
 Peugniez, Bernard, 2001: Routier cistercien. Abbayes et sites. France, Belgique, Luxembourg, Suisse (new expanded edition, p. 29). Moisenay: Éditions Gaud

External links 
 Certosa di Firenze website with photographs by Stephen Tobin 

Cistercian monasteries in France
Buildings and structures in Lot-et-Garonne
1123 establishments in Europe
1120s establishments in France
Christian monasteries established in the 12th century